Hasbún is a surname from Bethlehem origin. Notable people with the surname include:

Carlos Hasbún (born 1949), Salvadoran athlete
Hato Hasbún (1946–2017), Salvadoran politician
Ignacio Hasbún (born 1990), Chilean footballer
Rodrigo Hasbún (born 1981), Bolivian writer
Rosa Hasbún (born 1952), Salvadoran swimmer
Sergio Hasbún (born 1947), Salvadoran swimmer